The 1993 German Athletics Championships was the 93rd edition of the national championship in outdoor track and field for Germany. It was held on 8–11 July at the Wedaustadion in Duisburg. It served as the selection meeting for Germany at the 1993 World Championships in Athletics. A women's hammer throw was contested for the first time and the road running championship was set to the half marathon, having previously been 15 km for women and 25 km for men.

Championships
As usual, due to time or organizational reasons, various competitions were not held as part of the main event in Duisburg. The annual national championships in Germany held separately from the main track and field competition comprised the following:

Results

Men

Women

References 
General
 Fritz Steinmetz: Deutsche Leichtathletik-Meisterschaften Band 4 (1988–1993). Hornberger-Verlag, Waldfischbach 1994
 Deutscher Leichtathletik-Verband: Offizielles Jahrbuch 1993/94
 Fußball- und Leichtathletikverband Westfalen e.V. (HRSG): Leichtathletik in Westfalen 1993
 Zeitschrift Leichtathletik DSV Deutscher Sportverlag Köln, Jahrgang 1993, Ausgaben mit Ergebnislisten zu den verschiedenen Wettkampfergebnissen bei Deutschen Leichtathletikmeisterschaften 1993
Results

External links 
 Official website of the German Athletics Association 

1993
Sports competitions in North Rhine-Westphalia
Sport in Duisburg
Athletics Championships
German Championships
Athletics Championships